John Venzon, ACE, is an American film editor. He is best known for his work on The Bad Guys, The Lego Batman Movie, Storks, and South Park: Bigger, Longer & Uncut.

Career
Venzon graduated with a BFA in film studies from the University of Colorado Boulder. He is a member of American Cinema Editors (ACE), and the Academy of Motion Picture Arts and Sciences.

Filmography

Awards and nominations

References

External links
 

Living people
American film editors
Year of birth missing (living people)
American Cinema Editors